Escape! is a 1930 British crime film directed by Basil Dean and starring Gerald du Maurier, Edna Best and Gordon Harker. It was based on the 1926 play of the same title by John Galsworthy, which was adapted again as a film in 1948.

Plot
Captain Matt Denant (Gerald du Maurier) is a former army officer who had been pursued by Germans during the war. He is riding at a hunt and, though he enjoys the sport, he empathises with the fox who stands little chance against the hounds.

Later, after a dinner in London he decides to walk on his own through a busy Hyde Park. Denant begins talking with a girl in the park (Mabel Poulton), who reveals herself to be a prostitute. Denant declines the woman's proposition and turns to continue on his walk. At that moment a plain clothes police officer (George Curzon) accosts the woman and accuses her of harassing Denant. Denant protests her innocence, maintaining that she had committed no crime. Denant then distracts the policeman, in order to give the woman time to escape. He is then involved in a scuffle, which results in Denant punching the officer to the ground, who hits his head on a rail and promptly dies. Denant is charged with manslaughter and sentenced to five years' imprisonment at Dartmoor.

Two years later Denant is part of a prison party working on the moor when heavy fog quickly descends on the area. Emboldened by his experiences in Germany, he decides to attempt to escape in the mist. He passes the Warren House Inn, a remote country pub and sees that his disappearance has been reported by the local newspaper. Narrowly evading the local constabulary, he finds himself after two days back only a mile from the prison. Exhausted, he rests in a country house bedroom and the next morning is discovered by the lady of the house (Edna Best). Rather than report Denant, she gives him chocolate and a drink and allows him to shave. Empathising with Denant as a gentleman, she allows him to disguise himself in her husband's fishing gear and clears his path out of the estate.

Whilst fishing he is approached by another gentleman (Horace Hodges) who realises Denant's identity and, reflecting on the case, offers him a cigar and "winks the other eye". Denant later hijacks a motorcar from a picnicking party and asks two walkers for directions to Bovey. They tell a pursuing police officer that they did not suspect the man due to him being a gentleman.

Overwhelmed by his ordeal, Denant reaches a quarry where he collapses from exhaustion. He is again discovered but evades the workers, eventually making his way into an upper-class home where he is again protected, this time by two girls named Dora (Madeleine Carroll) and Grace (Marie Ney). Finally, he runs into the village church as the net closes around him. The parson (Austin Trevor) distracts the surrounding policemen, but rather than let the vicar break his honour and lie to the inspector, Denant reveals himself and surrenders. The vicar shakes Denant's hand as he is led away, reflecting that he was a "fine" and "loyal" fellow who had committed a noble act of martyrdom.

Cast

 Gerald du Maurier as Captain Matt Denant  
 Edna Best as Shingled Lady  
 Gordon Harker as Convict  
 Horace Hodges as Gentleman  
 Madeleine Carroll as Dora 
 Mabel Poulton as Girl of the Town  
 Lewis Casson as Farmer  
 Ian Hunter as Detective  
 Austin Trevor as Parson 
 Marie Ney as Grace  
 Felix Aylmer as Governor  
 Ben Field as Captain  
 Fred Groves as Shopkeeper 
 Nigel Bruce as Constable  
 S. J. Warmington as Warder  
 Phyllis Konstam as Wife
 Ann Casson as Girl 
 George Curzon as Constable

Production
Escape! was the first film produced by Associated Talking Pictures (ATP), a company formed by Basil Dean, a prominent theatre director who had recently been increasingly involved in film, enlisting the distinguished actor-manager Sir Gerald du Maurier as the company's chairman. ATP had been intended to capitalise on the shift from silent cinema to sound and, in January 1930, Dean announced that ATP had reached an agreement with RKO, then one of the major Hollywood film studios, to produce joined UK/US films in British studios. As well as receive national release in the UK, the agreement indicated ATP's films would also be released widely in America, benefiting from RKO's chain of cinemas. RKO and RCA technicians were dispatched to England to demonstrate to British crews how to setup sound recording equipment on location shoots. Escape!, based on a John Galsworthy play, was to the first film produced under this agreement after the rights were purchased from Paramount Pictures.

Dean knew this presented a major opportunity to demonstrate to the American studios that prestigious films could be produced in England, setting to work on engaging a high-profile cast with experience of the theatre. His first choice for the central role of Capt Matt Denant was Colin Clive, who turned Dean down in order to travel to Hollywood where he was to star in the role of Henry Frankenstein, creator of the monster in Universal's wildly successful horror film Frankenstein. In his place, Dean persuaded his reluctant chairman of ATP, Gerald du Maurier, a pre-eminent stage actor, to take the role himself.

For his supporting cast, Dean approached actors from the stage production, reducing the time needed to dedicate to rehearsals. Austin Trevor who had played the role of the Parson in London's West End in 1926 and New York City on Broadway the following year, reprised the role one more. The cast included Madeleine Carroll who would later become the world's highest-paid actress, George Curzon in his first film role, and Sir Lewis Casson in a rare on-screen credit.

As ATP did not yet have their own production facility (Dean would soon develop a full sound studio at Ealing Studios), Beaconsfield Studios, recently equipped to make sound films, was used instead. Dean's intention was to use Escape! to showcase England's picturesque scenery, with shoots arranged for Hyde Park Corner, a variety of locations around Dartmoor, and hunting scenes filmed in the village of Wansford. The Hyde Park night shoot attracted controversy, as Dean arranged to use amateur extras to populate the busy scenes rather than pay an excess for professional artists. In the face of pressure from acting unions, Dean eventually relented. The first attempt to film the Hyde Park scenes were compromised when Dean tried to record the music of the Welsh Guards band whom he had engaged for this purpose. A thrush landed on the microphone and refused to move. Frustrated, the musical director threw a piece of wood at the bird, which missed, hitting and destroying the microphone. The night's shooting was abandoned. It was the first film wholly intended as a sound film to be released in the UK.

Critical response
The Bioscope declared Escape! to be a "brilliant" adaptation, but noting that it "struck an occasional theatrical note". The location scenes were also praised, with du Maurier's performance declared to be "effective", with the climax displaying "deep sincerity". However, the paper felt that "too much of his time is spent clambering over walls, hiding in barns and driving an old Ford car over the downs". Overall, the reviewer believed that the potential of the film "to be a great popular success can hardly be questioned". Kinematograph Weekly believed the film was technically "flawless", acknowledging that Dean has worked hard to make the picture a success, with "imagination and good camera consciousness". However, it also noted that, though du Maurier's performance was "polished", he was "rather stilted and inclined to put too much stress on the sportsmanship, nobility, and breeding of the character that he interprets".

Though the film was critical success in England, it failed to recoup its £40,000 budget. Immediately following its British release, Escape! was released in the United States, appearing in over 700 cinemas nationally. This was an unprecedented release for a British film, but it ultimately failed to make any impact on American audiences.

References

External links
 
 
 1947 Theatre Guild on the Air radio adaptation of original play at Internet Archive

Films based on works by John Galsworthy
1930 films
1930s crime thriller films
1930 drama films
British crime films
British drama films
British thriller films
1930s English-language films
Films directed by Basil Dean
Associated Talking Pictures
Films shot at Beaconsfield Studios
Films set in Devon
Films set in London
British films based on plays
RKO Pictures films
British black-and-white films
Films shot in Buckinghamshire
1930s British films